Sophie Littlefield is an author of women's fiction, crime fiction, and young adult novels. In 2010, she was nominated for the Edgar  and won an Anthony Award for Best First Novel: A Bad Day for Sorry.  Littlefield was born in Missouri and resides in San Francisco, California.  She has a B.S. in computer science from  Indiana University.  She has served as president for the San Francisco chapter of Romance Writers of America.

Books 

Standalone novels
The Guilty One (2015) Gallery Books
The Missing Place (2014) Gallery Books
Garden of Stones (2013) Harlequin MIRA
House of Glass (2014) Harlequin MIRA
Hanging by a Thread (2012) Delacorte Books for Young Readers

Stella Hardesty Crime Series
A Bad Day for Sorry (2009) Minotaur Books 2010 Anthony Award for Best First Novel
A Bad Day for Pretty (2010) Minotaur Books
A Bad Day for Scandal (2011) Minotaur Books
A Bad Day for Mercy (2012) Minotaur Books
A Bad Day for Romance (2013) Minotaur Books

Aftertime Series
Aftertime (2011) Luna
Rebirth (2011) Luna
Horizon (2012) Luna

Joe Bashir Crime Series
Blood Bond (2012) Pocket Star
Shattered Bond (2013) Pocket Star

Hailey Tarbell Series
Banished (2010) Delacorte Books for Young Readers
Unforsaken (2011) Delacorte Books for Young Readers

References 

Year of birth missing (living people)
Living people
Anthony Award winners
American women novelists
American women children's writers
American children's writers
American crime writers
Women crime writers
Indiana University alumni
Novelists from Missouri
Writers from San Francisco
Novelists from California
21st-century American novelists
21st-century American women writers